Krutye is a rural locality (a village) in Paustovskoye Rural Settlement, Vyaznikovsky District, Vladimir Oblast, Russia. The population was 19 as of 2010.

Geography 
Krutye is located 16 km south of Vyazniki (the district's administrative centre) by road. Vorobyovka is the nearest rural locality.

References 

Rural localities in Vyaznikovsky District